Suburban Mayhem is a 2006 Australian film directed by Paul Goldman, written by Alice Bell, and produced by Leah Churchill-Brown, with Jan Chapman as executive producer. It features an ensemble cast including Emily Barclay, Michael Dorman, Anthony Hayes, Steve Bastoni, Mia Wasikowska and Genevieve Lemon. It was filmed in Sydney and Newcastle, Australia.

Suburban Mayhem had its world premiere at Cannes and its North American premiere at the Toronto International Film Festival. It was released shortly after in Australia on October 26, 2006, with subsequent releases around the world.

Plot

Katrina (Emily Barclay) is a 19-year-old single mother who is planning to murder. Katrina lives in a world of petty crime, fast cars, manicures and fornication. A master manipulator of men, she lives at home with a deadbeat father in suburban Golden Grove. Katrina will stop at nothing, including murder, to get what she wants. When her father threatens to contact Social Services and take away her child, Katrina sets in motion a plan to wreak suburban mayhem that will leave a community in shock and make Katrina infamous in a way even she never dreamed of.

It is loosely based upon a series of notorious murders by Mark Valera, who killed Frank Arkell and David O'Hearn, and upon his sister Belinda van Krevel and her then-partner Keith Schreiber, who killed Jack van Krevel.

Cast
 Emily Barclay as Katrina
 Michael Dorman as Rusty
 Anthony Hayes as Kenny
 Robert Morgan as John
 Genevieve Lemon as Dianne
 Laurence Breuls as Danny
 Steve Bastoni as Robert Andretti
 Mia Wasikowska as Lilya

Festivals
 2006 – France – Cannes Film Festival
 2006 – Australia – Melbourne International Film Festival
 2006 – Canada – Toronto International Film Festival

Awards
Won:
 2006 Australian Writers Guild: Best Original Feature Film (Alice Bell).
 2006 Inside Film Awards: Best Actress (Emily Barclay), Best Music, Best Editing.
 2006 Australian Film Institute Awards: Best Original Music Score (Mick Harvey)
 2006 Australian Film Institute Awards: Best Lead Actress (Emily Barclay)
 2006 Australian Film Institute Awards: Best Supporting Actor (Anthony Hayes)

Nominated:
 2006 Australian Film Institute Awards: Best Direction (Paul Goldman), Best Supporting Actress (Genevieve Lemon), AFI Young Actor Award (Mia Wasikowska), Best Original Screenplay (Alice Bell), Best Editing, Best Production Design, Best Costume Design, Best Sound.
 2006 Inside Film Awards: Best Feature Film, Best Director, Best Script.

Reception

Box office
Suburban Mayhem grossed $342,600 at the box office in Australia.

Critical reception
Suburban Mayhem has received mixed reviews from critics. On Rotten Tomatoes, the film has a "rotten" rating of 20%, based on 5 reviews, with an average rating of 4/10. Film scholar Bruno Starrs has critiqued the film with regard to Barbara Creed's notion of the "maternal feminine" monster.

See also

Cinema of Australia

References

External links
 
 
 Suburban Mayhem at the National Film and Sound Archive

2006 films
2006 comedy-drama films
Australian comedy-drama films
Australian black comedy films
Australian independent films
Films set in Australia
Films shot in Australia
2006 comedy films
2006 independent films
2000s English-language films